The Embassy of Azerbaijan in Kyiv is the diplomatic mission of Azerbaijan in Ukraine.

History 
Diplomatic relations between Azerbaijan and Ukraine were established on January 31, 1992. Embassy of Ukraine in Baku was established in 1996, the Embassy of Azerbaijan in Kyiv was opened in 1997.

List of ambassadors

See also 
 Azerbaijan–Ukraine relations
 Foreign relations of Azerbaijan
 Foreign relations of Ukraine
 Embassy of Ukraine, Baku
 Diplomatic missions in Ukraine

Recommended reading 
 Ukrainian diplomatic encyclopedia /Українська дипломатична енциклопедія: У 2-х т./Редкол.:Л. В. Губерський (голова) та ін. — К.:Знання України, 2004 — Т.1 — 760с. 
 Ukrainian diplomatic encyclopedia /Українська дипломатична енциклопедія: У 2-х т./Редкол.:Л. В. Губерський (голова) та ін. — К.:Знання України, 2004 — Т.2 — 812с.

References

External links 
 Ministry of Foreign Affairs of Ukraine
 Embassy of Azerbaijan in Kyiv

Azerbaijan
Kyiv
Azerbaijan–Ukraine relations